Dvirkivshchyna is a small Ukrainian village located in Boryspil Raion of Kyiv Oblast, 130 km east of the Ukrainian capital. It lays close to the city of Yahotyn. Dvirkivshchyna belongs to Yahotyn urban hromada, one of the hromadas of Ukraine. It also is an administrative seat of local rural community (silrada) which includes four village including Dvirkivshchyna. The community was formed in 1984 out of a state farm.

The village became a notable point of interest in 2000s as a birthplace of the former Ukrainian international footballer Andriy Shevchenko who played for Dynamo Kyiv, Milan and Chelsea.

Until 18 July 2020, Dvirkivshchyna belonged to Yahotyn Raion. The raion was abolished that day as part of the administrative reform of Ukraine, which reduced the number of raions of Kyiv Oblast to seven. The area of Yahotyn Raion was merged into Boryspil Raion.

References

Villages in Boryspil Raion